In Turkmenistan, television has been operating for over 50 years and is subject to vigorous state censorship. Notorious for a totalitarian control on media, Turkmenistan has consistently occupied one among the last three spots of the annual Press Freedom Index since its inception in 2006.

There are 7 television channels — Altyn Asyr, Yashlyk, Miras, The Turkmenistan TV Channel, Türkmen Owazy, Ashgabat TV, and Turkmenistan Sport. All of them used to be under the aegis of Ministry of Culture and Broadcasting of Turkmenistan, before being subsumed under the jurisdiction of the State Committee of Turkmenistan on TV, Radio and Film on 17 October 2011. The channels broadcast from Yamal 201, before shifting to their indigenous satellite TürkmenÄlem 52oE.

History 
In 1996, the Economist Intelligence Unit noted Turkmenistan to receive three channels — Channel One Russia, Sakhra, and Rossiyskyi. All were produced in Russia. Altyn Asyr, Yashlyk, and Miras were the first three channels to operate out of Turkmenistan. Writing in 2005, Paul Brummell finds the troika to serve similar content encompassing documentaries about Turkmenistan, music-and-dance concerts, and dubbed foreign films (esp. Bollywood). The top-right corner of each channel featured a silhouette of Niyazov's head.

Setting up of a fourth channel was authorized by Niyazov in February, 2004; it started broadcasting from 12 September of the same year. Originally named TV-4, it broadcasts in six languages and is aimed at an international audience. In December 2008, president Berdimuhamedov signed a decree "to promote the art of music and culture of the Turkmen people", establishing "Turkmen Owazy". The first broadcast was in January 2009. 

In December 2011, Berdimuhamedov authorized "Sport" for the widespread adoption of the country's principles of a healthy lifestyle, multiplying the thrust of youth to the sport with the conclusion of Turkmen sport at the international level". It was first aired on January 1, 2012. The channel broadcasts in the Turkmen language, and streams a multitude of sports.

Beginning late 2011, the country started moving towards digital TV broadcasting. In 2015, citizens were instructed to not use satellite dishes, apparently in order to preserve the aesthetics of the cityscape; critics deemed the policy as a tool of censuring non-state sources.

References 

 
Communications in Turkmenistan
Mass media in Turkmenistan